Mahmoud Mahmoud (born June 13, 1981) is an Egyptian footballer. He now plays in the defender position for Minya. He was a member of the Egyptian Olympic Team. Mahmoud played for Egypt at the 2001 FIFA World Youth Championship in Argentina.

Honours 
9 For Zamalek
Egyptian Premier League: 2
 2003, 2004
Egypt Cup: 1
 2002
Egyptian Super Cup: 2
2001, 2002
CAF Champions League: 1
 2002
CAF Super Cup: 1
2003
 Arab Champions Cup: 1
2003
Saudi-Egyptian Super Cup : 1
2003

International
 World Youth Cup Bronze Medalist: 2001 
 Francophone Games Bronze Medalist: 2001 
 African Youth Cup of Nations 3rd place: 2001

References

External links
 http://www.footballdatabase.eu/football.joueurs.mahmoud.mahmoud.61030.en.html

1981 births
Living people
Zamalek SC players
Egyptian footballers
Ittihad El Shorta SC players
Egypt youth international footballers
Egyptian Premier League players
Association football defenders